Samastha or Samasta may refer to,
 Samastha Kerala Jem-iyyathul Ulama, the Shafi'ite scholarly body in northern Kerala (1926–1989)
 Samastha Kerala Jem-iyyathul Ulama (1989–present)
 Samastha Kerala Sunni Jem-iyyathul Ulama affiliated to All India Sunni Jem-iyyathul Ulama